Arthur Alfred Wilmot (14 February 1845 — 12 May 1876) was an English clergyman and cricketer who played first-class cricket for Derbyshire in 1871.

Life
Wilmot was born in Chaddesden Hall, Derby the son of Sir Henry Sacheverel Wilmot and his wife Maria Mundy, sister of Edward Miller Mundy.  He was educated at Repton School and University College, Oxford. He took Holy Orders and became a clergyman. He also played club cricket for a number of sides including Free Foresters, Old Oxonians, Staffordshire, Burton and Gentlemen of Derbyshire. He became rector of Morley, Derbyshire in 1871.

Wilmot appeared in the second match Derbyshire played as a county side, in the  1871 season, in which he failed to score in either innings but took a catch.

Wilmot continued playing for club sides until 1874. He died at Morley at the age of 31.

Wilmot married Harriet Cecilia FitzHerbert in 1872 and their son Ralph Wilmot succeeded his brother Sir Henry Wilmot, 5th Baronet to the Baronetcy as the 6th Baronet.

References

1845 births
1876 deaths
English cricketers
Derbyshire cricketers
19th-century English Anglican priests
Cricketers from Derby
People educated at Repton School
Alumni of University College, Oxford